Mininskaya is a rural locality (a village) in Ramenskoye Rural Settlement, Syamzhensky District, Vologda Oblast, Russia. The population was 43 as of 2002.

Geography 
Mininskaya is located 48 km north of Syamzha (the district's administrative centre) by road. Markovskaya is the nearest rural locality.

References 

Rural localities in Syamzhensky District